SIMAP or simap may refer to:

 Similarity Matrix of Proteins, a database of protein similarities
 simap.ch, the official gazette for Swiss government procurement